The President's Advisory Council on Financial Capability was the successor to the President's Advisory Council on Financial Literacy (Bush, January 22, 2008). (Obama On January 29, 2010, the President signed Executive Order 13530). The last meeting of committee was in November 2012, and the Council officially ended on January 29, 2013. Its mission is to "improve Americans' understanding of financial products and terms, expand financial access, and provide appropriate and robust consumer protection." It is operated by the U.S. Treasury Department.

One member of this council is John Hope Bryant, who is an American financial literacy and poverty eradication activist, and "silver rights" entrepreneur. Bryant is the founder, chairman and CEO of nonprofit Operation HOPE.

Eldar Shafir is a Princeton University psychology professor who focuses on behavioral economics.  His appointment  to  the Council was announced April 9, 2012.

See also
 Financial literacy

References

External links
Improving Financial Education in America The White House blog
The President’s Advisory Council on Financial Capability, Resource Center, US Treasury Dept. website.

United States national commissions
2010 in American politics
Publications of the United States government
United States economic policy
United States Department of the Treasury agencies